Giannis Takidis (born 17 April 1981) is a Greek footballer who currently plays for  Rot-Weiss Frankfurt.

Club career
Takidis started his career playing with Kickers Offenbach at the Regionalliga.  Since 2005, he has been playing in Greece. On 18 July 2012, he signed a 1-year contract with Panetolikos F.C.

References

Panetolikos F.C. players
Greek footballers
Greek expatriate footballers
1981 births
Living people
Association football goalkeepers
Panegialios F.C. players
Footballers from Thessaloniki
Greek expatriate sportspeople in Germany
Expatriate footballers in Germany
Aiolikos F.C. players
Panachaiki F.C. players
Ilioupoli F.C. players
Kallithea F.C. players
Rot-Weiss Frankfurt players
Kickers Offenbach players